The 2016 season is Santos Futebol Clube's 104th season in existence and the club's fifty-seventh consecutive season in the top flight of Brazilian football. As well as the Campeonato Brasileiro, the club competes in the Copa do Brasil and the Campeonato Paulista.

On 8 May, Santos won their 22nd Campeonato Paulista title beating Audax 2–1 on aggregate in the final. On 6 November, after a 2–1 win against Ponte Preta, the club ensured their qualification to 2017 Copa Libertadores; fourteen days later, in a 2–2 draw against Cruzeiro, the club granted his place in the group stage of the competition. Santos ended the Campeonato Brasileiro in the 2nd position, 9 points behind leaders Palmeiras.

Players

Squad information

Source: SantosFC.com.br (for appearances and goals), Wikipedia players' articles (for international appearances and goals), FPF (for contracts)

Reserve team

Appearances and goals

Last updated: 12 December 2016
Source: Match reports in Competitive matches, Soccerway, Campeonato Brasileiro, Campeonato Paulista, Copa do Brasil

Goalscorers

Last updated: 12 December 2016
Source: Match reports in Competitive matches

Disciplinary record

As of 21 November 2016
Source: Campeonato Brasileiro, Campeonato Paulista, Copa do Brasil 
 = Number of bookings;  = Number of sending offs after a second yellow card;  = Number of sending offs by a direct red card.

National team call-ups

Suspensions served

Injuries

Squad number changes

Managers

Transfers

Transfers in

Loans in

Transfers out

Loans out

Overall transfer activity

Spending

Transfers in:  (~ R$8,300,000)

Loans in:  (~ R$300,000)

Total:  (~ R$8,600,000)

Income

Transfers out:   (~ R$86,600,000)

Loans out:   (~ R$0,000,000)

Total:   (~ R$86,600,000)

Balance

Profit/Loss:   (~ R$78,000,000)

Contracts

Pre-season and Friendlies

Sources:

Competitions

Overall

Detailed overall summary

{| class="wikitable" style="text-align: center"
|-
!
!Total
! Home
! Away
|-
|align=left| Games played          || 66 || 34 || 32
|-
|align=left| Games won             || 38 || 27 || 11
|-
|align=left| Games drawn           || 15 || 5 || 10
|-
|align=left| Games lost            || 13 || 2 || 11
|-
|align=left| Biggest win           || 4–1 v Mogi Mirim4–1 v Ferroviária || 4–1 v Mogi Mirim4–1 v Ferroviária || 3–0 v Galvez
|-
|align=left| Biggest loss          || 0–2 v Red Bull Brasil0–2 v Internacional0–2 v Flamengo || 0–1 v Internacional0–1 v Figueirense || 0–2 v Red Bull Brasil0–2 v Internacional0–2 v Flamengo
|-
|align=left| Clean sheets          || 26 || 17 || 9
|-
|align=left| Goals scored          || 110 || 70 || 40
|-
|align=left| Goals conceded        || 59 || 21 || 38
|-
|align=left| Goal difference       || +51 || +49 || +2
|-
|-
|-
|align=left| Yellow cards         || 133 || 63 || 70
|-
|align=left| Red cards       || 5 || 1 || 4
|-
|align=left| Most appearances     || align=center| Vanderlei (63) ||align=center| Vanderlei (33) ||align=center| Vanderlei (30)
|-
|align=left| Top scorer   || align=center| Ricardo Oliveira (22) ||align=center| Ricardo Oliveira (14) ||align=center| Ricardo Oliveira (8)
|-
|align=left|Worst discipline      || align=center| Lucas Lima  (1)  (15) ||align=center|Lucas Lima  (8)||align=center| Gustavo Henrique  (1)  (8)
|-
|align=left| Points               || 129/198 (%) || 86/102 (%) || 43/96 (%)
|-
|align=left| Winning rate         || % || % || %
|-

Campeonato Brasileiro

Results summary

Results by round

League table

Matches 

Source:

Copa do Brasil

First round

Second round

Third round

Round of 16

Quarter-finals

Campeonato Paulista

Results summary

Group stage

Matches

Knockout stage

Quarter-final

Semi-final

Finals

References

Notes

External links
Official Site 
Official YouTube Channel 

2016
Santos F.C.